The World Group was the highest level of Davis Cup competition in 1988.

West Germany won the title, defeating the defending champions Sweden in the final, 4–1. The final was held at the Scandinavium in Gothenburg, Sweden, from 16 to 18 December. It was the West German team's first Davis Cup title (having previously come runner-up in 1970 and 1985), becoming the ninth nation to win the Davis Cup.

Participating teams

Draw

First round

Sweden vs. New Zealand

Czechoslovakia vs. Paraguay

Mexico vs. Australia

Switzerland vs. France

West Germany vs. Brazil

Denmark vs. Spain

Italy vs. Israel

India vs. Yugoslavia

Quarterfinals

Sweden vs. Czechoslovakia

France vs. Australia

West Germany vs. Denmark

Yugoslavia vs. Italy

Semifinals

Sweden vs. France

West Germany vs. Yugoslavia

Final

Sweden vs. West Germany

Relegation play-offs
The first-round losers played in the Relegation Play-offs. The winners of the play-offs advanced to the 1989 Davis Cup World Group, and the losers were relegated to their respective Zonal Group I.

Results summary

Date: 8–10 April

Paraguay vs. New Zealand

Switzerland vs. Mexico

Spain vs. Brazil

References

External links
Davis Cup official website

World Group
Davis Cup World Group
Davis Cup